31P/Schwassmann–Wachmann, also known as Schwassmann–Wachmann 2, is a periodic comet in the Solar System. It was discovered on January 17, 1929, at an apparent magnitude of 11. The comet has been seen at every apparition.

The comet nucleus is estimated to be 6.2 kilometers in diameter. In 1929, the astronomer Anne Sewell Young identified the comet with an object that had been misidentified as the minor planet "Adelaide" (A904 EB).

References

External links 
 Orbital simulation from JPL (Java) / Horizons Ephemeris
 31P at Kazuo Kinoshita's Comets
 31P/Schwassmann-Wachmann 2 – Seiichi Yoshida @ aerith.net

Periodic comets
0031

19290117